The beautiful sunbird (Cinnyris pulchella), formerly placed in the genus Nectarinia, is a sunbird. It is native to tropical Africa, its range extending from Senegal and Guinea in the west to Sudan, South Sudan, Ethiopia, Tanzania and Kenya in the east.

Description
They have medium-length thin down-curved bills and brush-tipped tubular tongues, both of which are adaptations to their nectar feeding. The male has a black head, bright metallic green upper parts, scarlet breast bordered with yellow and black belly. The central feathers of the teal are greatly elongated. The female is brown above with yellowish underparts.

Ecology
The sunbirds are a group of very small Old World passerine birds which feed largely on nectar, although they will also take insects, especially when feeding young. Flight is fast and direct on their short wings. Most species can take nectar by hovering like a hummingbird, but usually perch to feed most of the time. The beautiful sunbird is a common breeder across sub-Saharan tropical Africa. One or two eggs are laid in a suspended nest in a tree. It is a seasonal migrant within its range.

Distribution and habitat

The beautiful sunbird occurs in Benin, Burkina Faso, Cameroon, Central African Republic, Chad,  Democratic Republic of the Congo, Côte d'Ivoire, Eritrea, Ethiopia, Gambia, Ghana, Guinea, Guinea-Bissau, Kenya, Mali, Mauritania, Niger, Nigeria, Senegal, Sierra Leone, South Sudan, Sudan, Tanzania, Togo and Uganda. This species is found in a variety of open habitats with some trees, including savannah, riverside thickets, mangroves, beachsides and gardens.

Status
The beautiful sunbird has a wide range and a large total population. It is a common bird and the International Union for Conservation of Nature has assessed its conservation status as being of "least concern".

Gallery

References

beautiful sunbird
Birds of Sub-Saharan Africa
beautiful sunbird
beautiful sunbird